Chris West (born 1954) is a British writer.  He works in a range of genres: business, psychology, history and crime / general fiction. His four mysteries written in the 1990s were among the first crime novels to be set in the contemporary People's Republic of China.

Biography
After studying economics and philosophy at the London School of Economics, West travelled in China, leading to his first book, Journey to the Middle Kingdom in 1991. Following that, he wrote the four crime novels featuring Wang Anzhuang, a mid-ranking detective in the Beijing Xing Zhen Ke (Criminal Investigation Department) and his wife, Rosina Lin, a nurse at the Capital Hospital. In 2020, these were reissued with new titles and Wang's name changed to Bao Zheng (a reference to a hero of traditional Chinese detective stories from the Song Dynasty).

On completing this series, West concentrated on co-authoring books aimed at entrepreneurs and small businesses, the first of which was The Beermat Entrepreneur, co-authored with entrepreneur and speaker Mike Southon (Southon and West were both members of The Oxcentrics, an Oxford-based Dixieland jazz band, in which West played the drums.).  This book was reissued in 2018 in an updated edition.

As a solo author he wrote Marketing on a Beermat and a guide to good, clear writing, Perfect Written English.

He has recently written social history, using everyday objects as 'ways in' to the subject. First Class, a History of Britain in 36 Postage Stamps was published in 2012, and A History of America in 36 Postage Stamps followed in 2013. Eurovision! A History of Modern Europe through the World's Greatest Song Contest was published in Spring 2017 and an updated version issued in 2020.

His first psychology book is The Karpman Drama Triangle Explained.

As a fiction writer he has published three novellas, two under the pseudonym Lytchett Maltravers.

West is married with one daughter and lives in North Hertfordshire.

Books 
 Journey to the Middle Kingdom,  Simon & Schuster, 1991. Allison and Busby, 2000.
 Death of a Blue Lantern,  Collins Crime 1994, Allison and Busby, 1999 and 2008.
 Death on Black Dragon River,  Collins Crime, 1995
 Red Mandarin,  Collins Crime, 1997
 The Third Messiah  Allison and Busby, 2000
 The Beermat Entrepreneur: Turn a Good Idea into a Great Business, Mike Southon and Chris West. Prentice Hall, 2002. (Reissued several times.)
 Myths about Doing Business in China, Harold Chee and Chris West, Palgrave, 2004 
 The Boardroom Entrepreneur,  Mike Southon and Chris West. Random House Business Books, 2005.
 Sales on a Beermat,  Mike Southon and Chris West. Random House Business Books, 2005.
 Finance on a Beermat,  Stephen King, Jeff Macklin and Chris West. Random House Business Books, 2006.
 Marketing on a Beermat,  Random House, 2008
 Perfect Written English,  Random House, 2008
 Think like an Entrepreneur,  Robbie Steinhouse and Chris West, Prentice Hall, 2008.
 First Class, A History of Britain in 36 Postage Stamps, Square Peg, 2012
 A History of America in Thirty-six Postage Stamps, Picador, 2014
 What's the Bloody Point of It All?, CWTK, 2019
 Eurovision! A History of Modern Europe through the World's Greatest Song Contest, Melville House, 2017 and 2020
 What's the Bloody Point of It All?, CWTK, 2019
 The Karpman Drama Triangle Explained: A Guide for Coaches, Managers, Trainers, Therapists and Everybody Else, CWTK 2020
 Footpath to Heaven (as Lytchett Maltravers), CWTK, 2020
 The Beijing Opera Murder, Sharpe Books, 2020
 The Hungry Ghost Murder, Sharpe Books, 2020
 The Red Mandarin Murder, Sharpe Books, 2020
 The Heavenly Kingdom Murder, Sharpe Books, 2020 
 Twenty Sonnets, CWTK, 2020
 Unexpected Alien in Bagging Area (as Lytchett Maltravers), CWTK 2021

References

External links 
  Chris West author website
 NLP training course in London co-designed by Chris West

1954 births
Living people
Alumni of the London School of Economics
British travel writers
British non-fiction writers
British male drummers
20th-century British novelists
21st-century British writers
British male novelists
20th-century British male writers
Oxcentrics members
Male non-fiction writers